This is a list of Federalist Party candidates for the offices of President of the United States and Vice President of the United States. Opponents who received over one percent of the popular vote or ran an official campaign that received Electoral College votes are listed. Offices held prior to Election Day are included, and those held on Election Day have an italicized end date.

List of Federalist tickets

1796, 1800

1804, 1808

1812

1816

1820

Notes

Other candidates

In addition to the candidates listed above, other Federalists received electoral votes between 1796 and 1820. In the 1796 election, Oliver Ellsworth, John Jay, James Iredell, Samuel Johnston, and Charles Cotesworth Pinckney all received at least one electoral vote. Jay also received a single vote in the 1800 election. In the 1816 election, Robert Goodloe Harper, John Marshall, and James Ross all received electoral votes for vice president. In the 1820 election, Robert Goodloe Harper, Daniel Rodney, and Richard Rush all received at least one electoral vote for vice president.

References

Works cited

 
 
 

Federalist Party
Federalist